Juan de Talavera  (Talavera de la Reina, ? 1476 -? 1531) (John of Talavera) was a Spanish architect, sculptor and carver, member of the "Toledo School of Architecture", and architect of Queen Isabella I of Castile. Probably his father was also named Juan de Talavera, and he was a nephew of Andrés de Talavera, both working in the Cathedral of Seville circa 1450. Juan de Talavera married Maria Gutierrez, daughter of Egas Coeman or Egas of Brussels and he was probably also a nephew of Juan Guas by his wife.

Juan de Talavera was disciple to some architects and sculptors who came from overseas to bring Spain new architectural models and artistic fashions from the rest of Europe, such as the French Juan Guas and the Flemish Egas of Brussels. Juan de Talavera belonged to the "Toledo School of Architecture".

His most valuable work is the facade of the University of Salamanca, also called the Puerta Rica (Rich Door) or Royal Facade, probably made with other partners on behalf of the Queen Joanna of Castile called "the Mad". Professor Alicia M. Canto has conducted a study on the matter.

Main masterpieces

 Facade of the University of Salamanca, Rich Door
 Various works in the Cathedral of Segovia
 Santa Maria de la Mejorada, Olmedo, Valladolid
 Carvings in the Cathedral of Sigüenza
 Carvings in the Cathedral of Toledo
 Collegiate Daroca, Zaragoza
 Colegio de San Gregorio, Valladolid (chapel)
 Collegiate Church of Calatayud, Zaragoza

References 

16th-century Spanish sculptors
Spanish male sculptors
1531 deaths
People from Toledo, Spain